Minuscule 276 (in the Gregory-Aland numbering), ε 163 (Soden), is a Greek minuscule manuscript of the New Testament, on parchment. It is dated by a colophon to the year 1092. 
It has full marginalia.

Description 

The codex contains the text of the four Gospels on 307 parchment leaves. The text is written in one column per page, in 21 lines per page.

There is also another division according to the smaller Ammonian Sections (in Mark 233 sections, the last in 16:8), whose numbers are given at the margin with references to the Eusebian Canons (written below Ammonian Section numbers).

Text 

The Greek text of the codex is a representative of the Byzantine text-type. Aland placed it in Category V.

According to the Claremont Profile Method it creates a textual cluster 276 in Luke 1, Luke  10, and Luke 20.

History 

The colophon states:
εγραψα χριστε τους ζωηφορους λογους ους αυτους εξεδωκας τοις αποστολοις κηρυξαι τουτους εις τον συμπαντα κοσμον αφες δεσποτα τα εμοι πεπραγμενα ωικηφορω τλημονι τω ταλαιπωρω, ος της μονης υπαρχω της μελετιου του τρις μακαρος τω βιω και τη πραξει βλεψον και τω κτητορι την δε την βιβλον. ιλεω σου ομματι ως ελεημων δανιηλ τε μοναχω τω ποθουντι σε λιταις σης μητρος της τεκουσης ασπορης και των τετταρων και σοφων ευαγγελιστων.

The manuscript was written by Nicephorus of the monastery Meletius. The manuscript was added to the list of New Testament manuscripts by Scholz (1794-1852). 
It was examined and described by Paulin Martin. and Henri Omont. C. R. Gregory saw the manuscript in 1885.

The manuscript is currently housed at the Bibliothèque nationale de France (Gr. 81) at Paris.

See also 

 List of New Testament minuscules
 Biblical manuscript
 Textual criticism

References

Further reading 

 Henri Omont, Fac-similés des manuscrits grecs datés de la Bibliothèque Nationale du IXe et XIVe siècle (Paris, 1891), 39.

Greek New Testament minuscules
11th-century biblical manuscripts
Bibliothèque nationale de France collections